The Ganges Delta (also known as the Ganges-Brahmaputra Delta, the Sundarbans Delta or the Bengal Delta) is a river delta in the Bengal region of South Asia, consisting of Bangladesh and the Indian state of West Bengal. It is the world's largest river delta and it empties into the Bay of Bengal with the combined waters of several river systems, mainly those of the Brahmaputra river and the Ganges river. It is also one of the most fertile regions in the world, thus earning the nickname the Green Delta. The delta stretches from the Hooghly River east as far as the Meghna River.

Geography

The Ganges Delta has the shape of a triangle and is considered to be an "arcuate" (arc-shaped) delta. Most of the delta is composed of alluvial soils made up by small sediment particles that finally settle down as river currents slow down in the estuary. Rivers carry these fine particles with them, even from their sources at glaciers as fluvio-glacial. Red and red-yellow laterite soils are found as one heads farther east. The soil has large amounts of minerals and nutrients, which is good for agriculture.

It is composed of a labyrinth of channels, swamps, lakes, and flood plain sediments (chars). The Gorai-Madhumati River, one of the distributaries of the Ganges, divides the Ganges Delta into two parts: the geologically young, active, eastern delta, and the older, less active, western delta.

Population
Around 280 million (180 million Bangladesh & 100 million West Bengal, India) people live on the delta, despite risks from floods caused by monsoons, heavy run-off from the melting snows of the Himalayas, and North Indian Ocean tropical cyclones. A large part of the nation of Bangladesh lies in the Ganges Delta; many of the country's people depend on the delta for survival.

It is believed that upwards of 300 million people are supported by the Ganges Delta; approximately 400 million people live in the Ganges River Basin, making it the most populous river basin in the world. Most of the Ganges Delta has a population density greater than 200/km2 (520 people per square mile), making it one of the most densely populated regions in the world.

Wildlife

Three terrestrial ecoregions cover the delta. The Lower Gangetic plains moist deciduous forests ecoregion covers most of the delta region, although the forests have mostly been cleared for agriculture and only small enclaves remain. Thick stands of tall grass, known as canebrakes, grow in wetter areas. The Sundarbans freshwater swamp forests ecoregion lies closer to the Bay of Bengal; this ecoregion is flooded with slightly brackish water during the dry season, and fresh water during the monsoon season. These forests, too, have been almost completely converted to intensive agriculture, with only  of the   protected. They derive their name from the predominant mangrove species, Heritiera fomes, which are known locally as sundri or sundari.

Animals in the delta include the Indian python (Python molurus), clouded leopard (Neofelis nebulosa), Indian elephant (Elephas maximus indicus) and crocodiles, which live in the Sundarbans. Approximately 1,020 endangered Bengal tigers (Panthera tigris tigris) are believed to inhabit the Sundarbans. The Ganges–Brahmaputra basin has tropical deciduous forests that yield valuable timber: sal, teak, and peepal trees are found in these areas.

It is estimated that 30,000 chital (Axis axis) are in the Sundarbans part of the delta. Birds found in the delta include kingfishers, eagles, woodpeckers, the shalik (Acridotheres tristis), the swamp francolin (Francolinus gularis), and the doel (Copsychus saularis). Two species of dolphin can be found in the delta: the Irrawaddy dolphin (Orcaella brevirostris) and the Ganges river dolphin (Platanista gangetica gangetica). The Irrawaddy dolphin is an oceanic dolphin which enters the delta from the Bay of Bengal. The Ganges river dolphin is a true river dolphin, but is extremely rare and considered endangered.

Trees found in the delta include sundari, garjan (Rhizophora spp.), bamboo, mangrove palm (Nypa fruticans), and mangrove date palm (Phoenix paludosa).

Geology
The Ganges Delta lies at the junction of three tectonic plates: the Indian Plate, the Eurasian Plate, and the Burma Plate. The edge of the Eocene paleoshelf runs approximately from Kolkata to the edge of the Shillong Plateau. The edge of the paleoshelf marks the transition from the thick continental crust in the northwest to the thin continental or oceanic crust in the southeast. The enormous sediment supply from the Himalayan collision has extended the delta about  seaward since the Eocene. The sediment thickness southeast of the edge of the paleoshelf beneath the Ganges Delta can exceed .

Economy

Approximately two-thirds of the Bangladesh people work in agriculture and grow crops on the fertile floodplains of the delta. The major crops that are grown in the Ganges Delta are jute, tea, and rice. Fishing is also an important activity in the delta region, with fish being a major source of food for many of the people in the area.

In the last decades of the 20th century, scientists helped the poor people of the delta to improve fish farming methods. By turning unused ponds into viable fish farms and improving methods of raising fish in existing ponds, many people can now earn a living raising and selling fish. Using new systems, fish production in existing ponds has increased 800%. Shrimp are farmed in containers or cages that are submerged in open water. Most are exported.

As there is a maze of many river branches, the area is difficult to pass. Most islands are only connected with the mainland by simple wooden ferryboats. Bridges are rare. Some islands are not yet connected to the electric grid, so island residents tend to use solar cells for a bit of electric supply.

Arsenic pollution

Arsenic is a naturally occurring substance in the Ganga Delta that has detrimental effects on health and may enter the food chain, especially in key crops such as rice.

Climate
Hot, dry summers and cool, dry winters make the climate suitable for agriculture.

Cyclones and flooding
In November 1970, the deadliest tropical cyclone of the twentieth century hit the Ganges Delta region. The 1970 Bhola cyclone killed 500,000 people (official death toll), with another 100,000 missing. The Guinness Book of World Records estimated the total loss of human life from the Bhola cyclone at 1,000,000.

Another cyclone hit the delta in 1991, killing about 139,000 people. It also left many people homeless.

People have to be careful on the river delta as severe flooding also occurs. In 1998, the Ganges flooded the delta, killing about 1,000 people and leaving more than 30 million people homeless. The Bangladesh government asked for $900 million to help feed the people of the region, as the entire rice crop was lost.

History of the Bengal Delta 
The history of the Bengal delta has been a concern of emerging scholarship by environmental historians.

Indian historian Vinita Damodaran has extensively profiled famine management practices by the East India Company, and related these practices to major ecological changes wrought about by forest and land management practices. Debjani Bhattacharyya has shown how Calcutta was constructed as an urban centre through tracing ecological changes wrought upon by colonial powers involving land, water and humans throughout the mid-18th to the early 20th centuries.

In terms of recent scholarship that focuses more on the eastern part of the Bengal/Ganges Delta, Iftekhar Iqbal argues for the inclusion of the Bengal Delta as an ecological framework within which to study the dynamics of agrarian prosperity or decline, communal conflicts, poverty and famine, especially throughout the colonial period. Iqbal has tried to show how resistance movements such as the Faraizi movement can be studied in relation to colonial ecological management practices.

A strong criticism of environmental history scholarship with regards to the Bengal/Ganges delta is that most of the scholarship is limited to the 18th to the 21st centuries, with a general dearth of ecological history of the region prior to the 18th century.

Future of the delta
One of the greatest challenges people living on the Ganges Delta may face in coming years is the threat of rising sea levels caused by climate change. An increase in sea level of  could result in six million people losing their homes in Bangladesh.

Important gas reserves have been discovered in the delta, such as in the Titas and Bakhrabad gas fields. Several major oil companies have invested in exploration of the Ganges Delta region.

Tidal river management 
To offset land loss, tidal river management has been implemented in the delta. This method has been implemented in 5 beels and resulted in benefits including decreased waterlogging, creation of agricultural areas, improved navigation and land creation.

View

See also
Doab
Gangotri
Gangetic Plain
Indian Subcontinent
Bay of Bengal
Bengal Tiger

Notes

References

External links

 The Golden Fibre Trade Centre: Ganges Delta: Most Fertile Land for Growing Raw Jute
 

.
Ganges basin
River deltas of Asia
Bay of Bengal
Landforms of Bangladesh
Landforms of India
Landforms of West Bengal
Environment of Bangladesh
Environment of West Bengal
Sundarbans
Regions of West Bengal
Regions of India